Oualid El Hamdaoui (born 5 February 1993 in Bagnols-sur-Cèze) is a French born Moroccan professional footballer, who currently plays for Latvian club FK RFS.

Career 
The striker played twelve games for the reserve team of AS Nancy B., before joined to Ligue 2 side FC Istres. He played only two games in the Ligue 2 for Istres. El Hamdaoui played since summer 2013 for Moroccan side COD Meknès.

References

External links
 

1993 births
Living people
People from Bagnols-sur-Cèze
French footballers
Association football forwards
AS Nancy Lorraine players
FC Istres players
FC Sète 34 players
AS Fabrègues players
Ligue 2 players
French expatriate footballers
Expatriate footballers in Morocco
Expatriate footballers in Latvia
COD Meknès players
FK RFS players
Sportspeople from Gard
Footballers from Occitania (administrative region)